JBO may refer to:

 JBO (band), a German heavy metal band
 Jay Bouwmeester (born 1983), Canadian professional ice hockey player
 Jean-Baptiste Ouédraogo, President of Upper Volta from November 1982 until August 1983
 Jerusalem Bird Observatory, Israel
 Jodrell Bank Observatory, UK
 Junior Boy's Own, a record label
 Junk Bond Observatory
 Lojban (ISO 639 code: jbo), a constructed language